Sergei Prokofiev wrote his Symphony No. 3 in C minor, Op. 44, in 1928.

Background
The music derives from Prokofiev's opera The Fiery Angel, a touching love story set against the backdrop of demonic possession. This opera had been accepted for performance in the 1927–28 season at the Berlin State Opera by Bruno Walter, but this production never materialised; in fact, the opera was never staged in Prokofiev's lifetime. Prokofiev, who had been working on the opera for years, was reluctant to let the music languish unperformed, and after hearing a concert performance of its second act given by Serge Koussevitzky in June 1928, he adapted parts of the opera to make his third symphony (shortly afterwards, he drew on his ballet The Prodigal Son for his Symphony No. 4 in similar fashion). The symphony, which was dedicated to Nikolai Myaskovsky was premiered on 17 May 1929 by Pierre Monteux conducting the Orchestre Symphonique de Paris.

Movements

The symphony is in four movements, lasting around 30–35 minutes.
 Moderato
 Andante
 Allegro agitato — Allegretto
 Andante mosso — Allegro moderato

Though the music of the symphony is based on that of the opera, the material is developed symphonically; the symphony is therefore absolute rather than programmatic.

The first movement, in traditional sonata form, opens with clashing chords played by the whole orchestra, along with tolling bells, setting a mood of threat and unrest. An impassioned first theme enters on strings, while a melancholy second theme on bassoons and lower strings provides contrast. The climactic development section follows, finding space for a third theme, which eventually combines with the first two themes. After a grave climax with gigantic orchestral chords and a last "struggle" in marching rhythms, the ethereal recapitulation ensues, in which the first and second themes are integrated, although much reduced and played softer, as if only the shadow of what was before remains.

The second movement, a meditative andante with a ternary structure, displays Prokofiev's talent in creating fragile, gossamer textures. The central section is more brooding in nature, with the theme consisting of semitones.

In the third movement, we hear hybrid elements from both of the movements that preceded it: though the textures are lighter than in the first movement, the sense of foreboding is back, as dithering strings create a chilling effect. They are intensified by insistent announcements from the brass choir and bass drum.

Finally, in the fourth movement, Prokofiev reprises musical materials from earlier in the symphony, beginning at a comfortable andante pace and gradually accelerating. The themes of the opening movement are threaded into the narrative before the Third comes to rest on a fearsome juggernaut of violent chords.

Instrumentation
The work is scored for the following:

Woodwind
Piccolo
2 Flutes
2 Oboes
Cor Anglais
2 Clarinets
Bass Clarinet
2 Bassoons
Contrabassoon
Brass
4 horns
3 Trumpets
3 Trombones
Tuba

Percussion
Timpani
Bass Drum
Snare Drum
Cymbals
Tambourine
Tam-tam
Castanets
Bell
Strings
2 Harps
Violins (1st and 2nd)
Violas
Cellos
Double basses

Recordings

References

Symphonies by Sergei Prokofiev
1928 compositions
Compositions in C minor